Hamish Barnes (born 22 May 1992) is a Jamaica international rugby league footballer who plays for the Keighley Cougars in Betfred League 1.

Background
Barnes was born in Halifax, West Yorkshire, England.

Playing career
Barnes started his career with various amateur teams in Halifax. Barnes toured Jamaica with the BARLA under-23 team in 2014 and while there was approached by the Jamaican rugby league federation about playing for Jamaica. Barnes is half-Jamaican and made his début for the Jamaica against Canada in 2014 while still an amateur player.

Barnes turned professional when he signed with Keighley in 2015.  After two seasons at Keighley, Barnes left to join Dewsbury Rams for the 2017 season but after only eight appearances for Dewsbury he was released by the club and re-signed for Keighley for the remainder of the 2017 season.

References

External links

1992 births
Living people
Dewsbury Rams players
Jamaican rugby league players
English rugby league players
Jamaica national rugby league team players
English sportspeople of Jamaican descent
Keighley Cougars players
Rugby league centres
Rugby league players from Halifax, West Yorkshire